Transnational Dispute Management (TDM) is a peer-reviewed online journal published by Maris B.V. TDM focuses on the management of international disputes, especially the rapidly evolving area of investment arbitration as well as other significant areas of international investment (such as for example oil, gas, energy, infrastructure, mining and utilities). TDM publishes articles covering both formal adjudicatory procedures (mainly investment and commercial arbitration) and also mediation and other ADR, negotiation and managerial ways to manage transnational disputes efficiently. TDM started publishing in February 2004. Professor Thomas W. Wälde (1949–2008) was founding editor of TDM. Mark Kantor is the current Editor-in-Chief of TDM.

TDM publishes both regular issues and Special Issues. Articles in TDM are often instantly "advance published" on-line and then incorporated into regular issues when those issues are fully organized. In addition, TDM maintains a Legal & Regulatory Materials database available to subscribers.

OGEMID

TDM hosts the archives of OGEMID, the associated discussion list focused on transnational disputes, international investment law developments and related issues. OGEMID brings together experienced professionals in the field of international dispute management, mainly arbitration, mediation, negotiation, with a particular emphasis on investment disputes. Since 2007 OGEMID members annually vote for the OGEMID Awards. Moderators of OGEMID currently include Saadia A. Bhatty, Professor Petra Butler, Barry Leon, Dr. Sebastien Manciaux and Baiju Vasani, with Sophie Nappert, Consultant Moderator Maurice Mendelson QC and OGEMID Rapporteur John Gaffney as Honorary members.

References

External links
Transnational Dispute Management official website

Publications established in 2004
International law journals